The 2002–03 Pittsburgh Panthers men's basketball team represented the University of Pittsburgh in the 2002–03 NCAA Division I men's basketball season. This was Pitt's first season playing in the Petersen Events Center. Led by head coach Ben Howland, the Panthers finished with a record of 28–5 and battled their way to the Sweet Sixteen of the 2003 NCAA Division I men's basketball tournament. Following the season, Coach Howland left to become head coach of UCLA.

Roster

Tournament results

Big East tournament
3/13/03 @ Madison Square Garden, New York, NY Vs. Providence W, 67–59
3/14/03 @ Madison Square Garden, New York, NY Vs. Boston College W, 61–48
3/15/03 @ Madison Square Garden, New York, NY Vs. Connecticut W, 74–56

NCAA tournament
3/21/03 @ TD Garden, Boston, MA Vs. Wagner W, 87–61
3/23/03 @ TD Garden, Boston, MA Vs. Indiana W, 74–51
3/27/03 @ Metrodome, Minneapolis, MN Vs. Marquette L, 74–77

References

Pittsburgh Panthers men's basketball seasons
Pittsburgh
Pittsburgh
Pittsburgh Pan
Pittsburgh Pan